The 2019–20 DFB-Pokal was the 77th season of the annual German football cup competition. Sixty-four teams participated in the competition, including all teams from the previous year's Bundesliga and 2. Bundesliga. The competition began on 9 August 2019 with the first of six rounds and ended on 4 July 2020 with the final at the Olympiastadion in Berlin, a nominally neutral venue, which has hosted the final since 1985. The DFB-Pokal is considered the second-most important club title in German football after the Bundesliga championship. The DFB-Pokal is run by the German Football Association (DFB).

The defending champions were Bundesliga side Bayern Munich, after they defeated RB Leipzig 3–0 in the previous final.

Bayern successfully defended their title, winning their 20th DFB-Pokal title after beating Bayer Leverkusen 4–2 in the final. With the win, Bayern completed their second consecutive and 13th domestic double overall, and therefore will play home (in a change of format; under old rules they would have played away as was the case the previous year) to 2019–20 Bundesliga runners-up Borussia Dortmund in the 2020 DFL-Supercup. Because Bayern qualified for the Champions League through the Bundesliga, the sixth-place team in the Bundesliga, 1899 Hoffenheim, earned qualification for the group stage of the 2020–21 edition of the UEFA Europa League, and the league's second round spot went to the team in seventh, VfL Wolfsburg.

Effects of the COVID-19 pandemic
On 27 March 2020, the German Football Association (DFB) indefinitely postponed the semi-finals of the competition, originally scheduled for 21 and 22 April, due to the COVID-19 pandemic in Germany. On 24 April, the DFB also indefinitely postponed the final of the competition, originally scheduled for 23 May, with the goal of completing the competition by 30 June 2020. On 11 May 2020, the DFB Executive Committee approved a resumption of the competition, subject to political approval, using a hygiene concept similar to that implemented by the DFL in the Bundesliga and 2. Bundesliga. The semi-finals would take place on 9 and 10 June, while the final would take place on 4 July 2020. However, the remaining matches were required to be played behind closed doors without any spectators. In addition, five substitutions were permitted for the remaining matches following a proposal from FIFA and approval by IFAB, meant to lessen the impact of fixture congestion.

Participating clubs
The following 64 teams qualified for the competition:

Format

Participation
The DFB-Pokal began with a round of 64 teams. The 36 teams of the Bundesliga and 2. Bundesliga, along with the top 4 finishers of the 3. Liga, automatically qualified for the tournament. Of the remaining slots, 21 were given to the cup winners of the regional football associations, the Verbandspokal. The 3 remaining slots were given to the three regional associations with the most men's teams, which was Bavaria, Lower Saxony and Westphalia. The best-placed amateur team of the Regionalliga Bayern was given the spot for Bavaria. For Lower Saxony, the Lower Saxony Cup was split into two paths: one for 3. Liga and Regionalliga Nord teams, and the other for amateur teams. The winners of each path qualified. For Westphalia, the winner of a play-off between the best-placed team of the Regionalliga West and Oberliga Westfalen also qualified. As every team was entitled to participate in local tournaments which qualified for the association cups, every team could in principle compete in the DFB-Pokal. Reserve teams and combined football sections were not permitted to enter, along with no two teams of the same association or corporation.

Draw
The draws for the different rounds were conducted as follows:

For the first round, the participating teams were split into two pots of 32 teams each. The first pot contained all teams which had qualified through their regional cup competitions, the best four teams of the 3. Liga, and the bottom four teams of the 2. Bundesliga. Every team from this pot was drawn to a team from the second pot, which contained all remaining professional teams (all the teams of the Bundesliga and the remaining fourteen 2. Bundesliga teams). The teams from the first pot were set as the home team in the process.

The two-pot scenario was also applied for the second round, with the remaining 3. Liga and/or amateur team(s) in the first pot and the remaining Bundesliga and 2. Bundesliga teams in the other pot. Once again, the 3. Liga and/or amateur team(s) served as hosts. This time the pots did not have to be of equal size though, depending on the results of the first round. Theoretically, it was even possible that there could be only one pot, if all of the teams from one of the pots from the first round beat all the others in the second pot. Once one pot was empty, the remaining pairings were drawn from the other pot, with the first-drawn team for a match serving as hosts.

For the remaining rounds, the draw was conducted from just one pot. Any remaining 3. Liga and/or amateur team(s) were the home team if drawn against a professional team. In every other case, the first-drawn team served as hosts.

Match rules
Teams met in one game per round. Matches took place for 90 minutes, with two halves of 45 minutes. If still tied after regulation, 30 minutes of extra time were played, consisting of two periods of 15 minutes. If the score was still level after this, the match was decided by a penalty shoot-out. A coin toss decided who took the first penalty. The number of substitutes allowed on the bench was increased from seven to nine for the 2019–20 season. Initially, three substitutions were allowed during regulation, with a fourth allowed in extra time. From the round of 16 onward, a video assistant referee was appointed for all DFB-Pokal matches. Though technically possible, VAR was not used for home matches of Bundesliga clubs prior to the round of 16 in order to provide a uniform approach to all matches.

For the semi-finals and final, a maximum of five substitutions were allowed. However, each team was only given three opportunities to make substitutions, with a fourth opportunity in extra time, excluding substitutions made at half-time, before the start of extra time and at half-time in extra time.

Suspensions
If a player would have received five yellow cards in the competition, he would have then been suspended from the next cup match. Similarly, receiving a second yellow card suspended a player from the next cup match. If a player receives a direct red card, they were suspended a minimum of one match, but the German Football Association reserves the right to increase the suspension.

Champion qualification
The winner of the DFB-Pokal typically earns automatic qualification for the group stage of next year's edition of the UEFA Europa League. If they had already qualified for the UEFA Champions League through position in the Bundesliga, then the spot would go to the team in sixth, and the league's second qualifying round spot would go to the team in seventh. The winner also typically hosts the DFL-Supercup at the start of the next season, facing the champion of the previous year's Bundesliga, unless the same team wins the Bundesliga and the DFB-Pokal, completing a double. In that case, the runner up of the Bundesliga takes the spot and hosts instead.

Schedule

All draws were generally held at the German Football Museum in Dortmund, on a Sunday evening at 18:00 after each round (unless noted otherwise). The draws were televised on ARD's Sportschau, broadcast on Das Erste.

The rounds of the 2019–20 competition were scheduled as follows:

Matches
A total of sixty-three matches took place, starting with the first round on 9 August 2019 and culminating with the final on 4 July 2020 at the Olympiastadion in Berlin.

Times up to 26 October 2019 and from 29 March 2020 are CEST (UTC+2). Times from 27 October 2019 to 28 March 2020 are CET (UTC+1).

First round
The draw for the first round was held on 15 June 2019 at 18:00, with Nia Künzer drawing the matches. The thirty-two matches took place from 9 to 12 August 2019.

Second round
The draw for the second round was held on 18 August 2019 at 18:00, with Sebastian Kehl drawing the matches. The sixteen matches took place from 29 to 30 October 2019.

Round of 16
The draw for the round of 16 was held on 3 November 2019 at 18:00, with Turid Knaak drawing the matches. The eight matches took place from 4 to 5 February 2020.

Quarter-finals
The draw for the quarter-finals was held on 9 February 2020 at 18:00, with Cacau drawing the matches. The four matches took place from 3 to 4 March 2020.

Semi-finals
The draw for the semi-finals was held on 8 March 2020 at 18:00, with Almuth Schult drawing the matches. The two matches took place from 9 to 10 June 2020.

1. FC Saarbrücken of the Regionalliga Südwest became the first fourth-division club in the history of the DFB-Pokal to reach the semi-finals of the competition.

Final

The final took place on 4 July 2020 at the Olympiastadion in Berlin.

Top goalscorers
The following were the top scorers of the DFB-Pokal, sorted first by number of goals, and then alphabetically if necessary. Goals scored in penalty shoot-outs are not included.

Notes

References

External links
 
DFB-Pokal on kicker.de 

2019-20
2019–20 in German football cups
Association football events postponed due to the COVID-19 pandemic